Jeswin Aldrin is an India Long Jumper. He is a national record holder in long jump with 8.42m.

Personal information 
He comes from a Pious Christian Family. He is born to Johnson Isaac (Father) and Esther Selva Rani (Mother). He has two younger brothers Jerwin Isaac and Joywin Joseph. His elder sister is Adriana SKI and younger sister is Francina SKI. Jeswin Aldrin’s Uncle Simon Isaac who currently lives in Chennai plays a major role in shaping and motivating Jeswin Aldrin. Jeswin’s prayerful grandma is Devakani Isaac and grand father is S.T. Isaac (late).

Career 
He qualified in Long Jump for 2022 World Athletics Championships but failed to qualify for finals. He holds national record with 8.42m jump.

References

External links 
 

Indian male long jumpers
Athletes from Tamil Nadu